Open-source routing platforms may refer to:
 Conventional routing daemons
 Babel
 B.A.T.M.A.N.
 BIRD
 OpenBGPD
 OpenOSPFD
 Quagga
 XORP
 Zebra
 Optimized Link State Routing Protocol
 FRRouting
 GoBGP
 Software distributions
 OPNsense
 pfSense
 Vyatta
 VyOS
 Carrier Grade Linux
 Cumulus Linux
 Other protocols and software

References